Gustavo Adolfo Costas Makeira (born 28 February 1963) is an Argentine football manager and former player who played as a defender. He is the current manager of the Bolivia national team.

Playing career
Born in Buenos Aires, Costas started his playing career in 1982 with Racing Club, in 1983 the club suffered a disastrous relegation from the Primera División. Costas became a key part of the team that won promotion back to the Primera in 1985.

In 1988 Costas was part of the Racing Club team that won the Supercopa Sudamericana, their first major title in 21 years, they then went on to win the less prestigious Supercopa Interamaricana. He left Racing in 1992 to join Swiss team FC Locarno, after playing over 100 games for them he returned to Racing in 1994.

Costas left Racing again in 1995 having played in a club record 298 games, scoring six goals. He joined Gimnasia de Jujuy where he played until his retirement in 1997.

Managerial career
Costas then took charge as manager of Alianza Lima in Peru in 2003. He immediately led them to success in the Clausura 2003, and then saw his team win the Primera División Peruana final against Sporting Cristal.

In 2004, Costas led Alianza to the Apertura 2004 title and another chance to win the final of the Primera División where they again defeated Sporting Cristal, this time 5-4 on penalties. In 2005, he became the manager of Cerro Porteño in Paraguay, under his leadership the club won both the Apertura and Clausura in 2005 to be crowned undisputed national champions.

In 2007 Costas returned to Racing Club for his second spell in charge of  "La Academia". Costas has currently signed a 2-year contract to manage Olimpia of Paraguay starting at the 2008 season.

In 2009 Costas returned to Alianza Lima and led them to play the final against Universitario. On 18 July 2011, he signed for Al Nassr FC from Saudi Arabia, but was dismissed on 30 November after due to poor results.

On 11 April 2012, Costas became the head coach of Ecuadorian club Barcelona SC, signing a one-year contract ending in June 2013. He won the first stage which secured Barcelona a spot to the 2012 Copa Sudamericana, 2013 Copa Libertadores and the third stage of the Ecuadorian Serie A. On 2 December, Barcelona won the second stage, automatically becoming the champion of the 2012 Ecuadorian Serie A. Costas has extended his contract until December 2013.

On 6 June 2019, Costas was appointed manager of Club Guaraní. On 20 December 2021, he became manager of Palestino.

On 19 August 2022, Costas was presented as manager of the Bolivia national team, effective as the following November, once his season with Palestino ended.

Managerial statistics

Honours

Manager
Alianza Lima
 Peruvian Primera División: 2003, 2004

Cerro Porteño
 Paraguayan Primera División: 2005

Barcelona
 Ecuadorian Serie A: 2012

Santa Fe
 Categoría Primera A: 2014 Finalización, 2016 Finalización
 Superliga Colombiana: 2015
 Suruga Bank Championship: 2016

References

External links

 Futbol Peruano profile 
 

1963 births
Living people
Footballers from Buenos Aires
Argentine footballers
Association football defenders
Barcelona S.C. managers
Argentine Primera División players
Racing Club de Avellaneda footballers
Gimnasia y Esgrima de Jujuy footballers
Argentine football managers
Racing Club de Avellaneda managers
Club Alianza Lima managers
Club Olimpia managers
FC Locarno players
Al Nassr FC managers
Independiente Santa Fe managers
Al-Fayha FC managers
Atlas F.C. managers
Club Guaraní managers
Club Deportivo Palestino managers
Bolivia national football team managers
Saudi Professional League managers
Expatriate footballers in Switzerland
Expatriate football managers in Chile
Expatriate football managers in Colombia
Expatriate football managers in Paraguay
Expatriate football managers in Ecuador
Expatriate football managers in Peru
Expatriate football managers in Saudi Arabia
Expatriate football managers in Bolivia